Ellery Queen, Master Detective is a 1940 American mystery film directed by Kurt Neumann and written by Eric Taylor. The film stars Ralph Bellamy, Margaret Lindsay, Charley Grapewin, James Burke, Michael Whalen and Marsha Hunt. The film was released on November 30, 1940, by Columbia Pictures.

Plot
John Braun, healthy and athletic model for his fitness enterprise, gets fatally ill and on the next day changes his will, leaving everything to his company. John locks himself up in his study, but Nikki goes to talk with him. She waits in the anteroom, but finds herself locked in and when they finally manage to open the door, they find Braun sitting at his desk, stabbed, and both the will and the murder weapon missing.

Cast          
Ralph Bellamy as Ellery Queen
Margaret Lindsay as Nikki Porter
Charley Grapewin as Inspector Queen
James Burke as Sergeant Velie
Michael Whalen as Dr. James Rogers
Marsha Hunt as Barbara Braun
Fred Niblo as John Braun
Charles Lane as Dr. Prouty
Ann Shoemaker as Lydia Braun
Marion Martin as Cornelia
Douglas Fowley as Rocky Taylor
Morgan Wallace as Zachary
Byron Foulger as Amos
Katherine DeMille as Valerie Norris

References

External links
 

1940 films
American mystery films
1940 mystery films
Columbia Pictures films
Films directed by Kurt Neumann
American black-and-white films
1940s English-language films
1940s American films
Ellery Queen films